Grand Hotel Opduin is a Dutch hotel located in the Dunes of Texel National Park. It is privately owned and affiliated with Hampshire Classic Hotels.

The building is situated on top of the dunes on the edge of the village of De Koog, Texel, approximately 200m from the North Sea beach. The hotel has its own beach cabins. The hotel has 96 rooms and suites, as well as six multifunctional conference rooms. In and around the hotel are three restaurants, a tennis court, a fitness room and a beauty & wellness center.
The hotel has an active environmental policy and in 2005 it was the first tourist location in the Netherlands to receive the EU Ecolabel.

History

In 1934 Hein and Trijntje Wuis started a pension called Villa Op Duin. The pension was built beside a sandy road, and had no surrounding buildings.
Architect was L.Igesz who also designed the Esperanto monument in Den Burg. The pension had eleven rooms and was its time far ahead with electric light, central-heating and warm and cold running water on each room. A pump system was installed to subtract the needed fresh water from the dunes.
In the Second World War the hotel was confiscated by the Germans to house officers.

In 1966 behind the villa a new wing with three floors and a restaurant was built. One year later the hotel was passed on to son Harry P. Wuis. In 1977 the floors were extended and an extra floor was built on top of the existing ones. Later (in 1988) the hotel build yet another extra wing.

After twelve years of being assistant general manager, C. Den Ouden and his wife H. Den Ouden-Nuninga took over the hotel in the year 2000. In 2004 a brasserie named De Franse Slag and a restaurant named De Heeren XVII were added. Also a new stainless steel swimming pool was installed and a beauty & wellness center was opened. In 2005 all the hotel rooms were renovated.

References

External links 
 Grand Hotel Opduin

Texel
Hotels in the Netherlands
Buildings and structures in North Holland